Kaersutite is a dark brown to black double chain calcic titanium bearing amphibole mineral with formula: NaCa2(Mg3Ti4+Al)(Si6Al2)O22(O)2. 

Ferro-kaersutite is the divalent iron rich endmember of the kaersutite group, with the iron replacing magnesium in the structure.

It occurs as phenocrysts in alkalic volcanic rocks; in nodules of peridotite and gabbro in alkalic basalts; in syenites, monzonites and carbonatite tuffs. Mineral association includes titanian augite, rhoenite, olivine, ilmenite, spinel, plagioclase and titanian pargasite.
 
It was first described in 1884 and is named for Qaersut (formerly Kaersut), Umanq district in northern Greenland.

References

Amphibole group
Monoclinic minerals
Minerals in space group 12